Uday Tikekar (born 4 December 1960) is an Indian film and television actor. He began his career in Marathi theatre, also putting up performances in Hindi theatre. He is married to classical singer Arati Ankalikar-Tikekar, who is a 2-time National Film Award winner.
Participated in numerous famous movies like Raees and madari, also starred in hindi serials like kasauti zindagi ki, krishnadasi and bhagya lakshmi.

Personal life

He is married to classical singer Arati Ankalikar-Tikekar. The couple have a daughter Swanandi Tikekar who is also an actress

Filmography

Television

References

External links

Indian male film actors
People from Latur
People from Maharashtra
Marathi people
21st-century Indian male actors
Male actors in Hindi cinema
People from Marathwada
Living people
1965 births
Male actors in Marathi television